The 1954 Lehigh Engineers football team was an American football team that represented Lehigh University during the 1954 college football season. Lehigh tied for the Middle Three Conference championship.

In their ninth year under head coach William Leckonby, the Engineers compiled a 2–5–2 record. In the Middle Three Conference, all three teams finished with 1–1 records. Harry Stotz was the team captain.

Lehigh played its home games at Taylor Stadium on the university's main campus in Bethlehem, Pennsylvania.

Schedule

References

Lehigh
Lehigh Mountain Hawks football seasons
Lehigh Engineers football